= MiracleNet =

- Type: Satellite & Cable television network
- Country: India, Asia
- Availability: Asia
- Owner: Dr. Michael Hughes and Sarah Hughes
- Launch date: 1999
- Official website: http://www.miraclenet.tv

MiracleNet is a Christian television network run by Dr. Michael Hughes and Mrs. Sarah Hughes. It is distributed to India and much of Asia via cable and satellite simultaneously in Hindi, Urdu, Telugu, and Malayalam.

MiracleNet TV Network covering all of Asia by Satellite to Cable TV and by individual satellite dishes,

== Audience ==
MiracleNet with Cable TV homes, has a potential audience of 113,770,000 Viewers in Asia,

== Social Work ==
MiracleNet has been doing substantial Social work and acts of Mercy, which include Education, Health.
